Goliath is a steel roller coaster located at the Six Flags Over Georgia amusement park in Cobb County, Georgia. Prior to its construction, the Great Gasp and Looping Starship attractions were removed to make room for Goliath, which opened to the public on April 1, 2006. It ranked as the fourth-best new ride of 2006 in the annual Golden Ticket Awards publication from Amusement Today and the ninth-best steel roller coaster overall, with its peak ranking of fourth occurring in 2009 and 2011.

History
Plans for Goliath were announced in September 2005, revealing the ride as a steel hypercoaster from Bolliger & Mabillard that will cost $20 million to construct. By the end of the 2005 season, the rides Great Gasp and Looping Starship were closed and removed from the park to make room for the new roller coaster. Foundations for Goliath's supports began to be poured in September 2005. In early October, track began to arrive at the park; erection of the supports and track began soon after. In November and December, construction on the lift hill was complete. In March 2006, Goliath's trains were delivered to the park. After construction on the track and testing was complete, the roller coaster opened to the public on April 1, 2006.

Ride experience

After being dispatched from the station, the train makes a left hand turn towards the  chain lift hill. As the train exits the park boundaries, it enters a banked left turn then its second camelback hill with a  drop. Next, the train rises back up and enters a 540-degree downward helix before passing through a set of trim brakes and going over the third camelback hill, this time with a  drop. Following a banked left turn, the train makes a quick drop before entering the final brake run leading back to the station. One cycle of the ride lasts about three and a half minutes.

Characteristics

Track
The roller coaster has no inversions, though it does feature six camelback hills and a 540 degree helix. The track is painted orange while the supports are painted teal. Goliath was manufactured by Clermont Steel Fabricators located in Batavia, Ohio.

Trains
Goliath operates with two steel and fiberglass trains. Each train has nine cars which can seat four riders in a single row, for a total of 36 riders per train; each seat has its own individual lap-bar restraint. This configuration allows the ride to achieve a theoretical hourly capacity of 1,220 riders per hour. The structure of the trains are painted orange and teal, with matching colored restraints and seats.

Reception
Joel Bullock from The Coaster Critic and Mike from NewsPlusNotes both praised the g-forces experienced while going through the helix, and the amount of airtime Goliath has. Bullock described Goliath as, "not only the park’s best roller coaster, but arguably the best coaster in the South East (south of Virginia)." Mike Collins from Coaster Radio particularly enjoyed the section of the roller coaster that takes riders outside of the park boundaries. He also said that, "[Goliath is] a fun and fast coaster. It’s all about the airtime... and you get a lot of it."

In Goliath's opening year, it was voted the fourth best new ride for 2006 and the ninth best steel roller coaster in Amusement Today's Golden Ticket Awards. The roller coaster peaked at position four in 2009 and 2011.

Incidents

On July 27, 2006, a 45-year-old man was found unresponsive and not breathing on Goliath after losing consciousness during the ride. Park employees began to treat the man before he was taken to a local hospital and pronounced dead. After an inspection of the ride showed that the roller coaster was operating properly, it reopened to the public.

References

External links

 Official Page From Six Flags Over Georgia
 

Roller coasters in Georgia (U.S. state)
Roller coasters operated by Six Flags
Roller coasters introduced in 2006
Six Flags Over Georgia
Hypercoasters manufactured by Bolliger & Mabillard